Rangamura is a village situated on the hills of Boromura range in Tripura, India. The populace consists of tribes like Kuki, Hrangkhawl, Koloi, Tripuri, Kaipeng and others.

It is 3 km away from Tuichindrai, the nearest point on National Highway 44. An Assam Rifles colony is being set up in Rangamura.

References

Villages in South Tripura district